

Canadian Football News in 1934
The Sarnia Imperials, who won nine-straight Ontario Rugby Football Union titles from 1931 to 1939, won its first Grey Cup title against the Regina Roughriders, who were playing in their seventh final in 12 years. It was the last time the Regina Roughriders made it to the Grey Cup until 1951. In its first seven trips, Regina was outscored by the opposition 176–27.

Eastern Intercollegiate Union formally withdrew from Grey Cup competition.

The horn was introduced to officiating.

Regular season

Final regular season standings
Note: GP = Games Played, W = Wins, L = Losses, T = Ties, PF = Points For, PA = Points Against, Pts = Points
*Bold text means that they have clinched the playoffs.

* Final League game cancelled

https://news.google.com/newspapers?nid=Fr8DH2VBP9sC&dat=19341112&printsec=frontpage The Montreal Gazette – November 12, 1934 – pg. 14

League Champions

Grey Cup playoffsNote: All dates in 1934CIRFU FinalsQueen's does not participate in further competitionSemifinalsVancouver advances to the Western FinalRegina advances to the Western Final.FinalsRegina won the total-point series by 29–4. Regina advances to the Grey Cup game.Sarnia advances to the Grey Cup game.Playoff bracket

Grey Cup Championship

1934 Eastern (Combined IRFU & ORFU) All-Stars  selected by Canadian PressNOTE: During this time most players played both ways, so the All-Star selections do not distinguish between some offensive and defensive positions.1st Team
QB – Carl Pernia, Montreal AAA Winged Wheelers
FW – Don Young, McGill University
HB – Hugh Welch, Montreal AAA Winged Wheelers
HB – Jack Taylor, Toronto Argonauts
DB – Ted Morris, Toronto Argonauts
E  – Wes Cutler, Toronto Argonauts
E  – Seymour Wilson, Hamilton Tigers
C  – Lew Newton, Montreal AAA Winged Wheelers
G – Bert Adams, Montreal AAA Winged Wheelers
G – Jim Palmer, Toronto Argonauts
T – Tommy Burns, Toronto Argonauts
T – Pete Joktus, Montreal AAA Winged Wheelers2nd Team
QB – Alex Hayes, Sarnia Imperials
FW – Bud Andrew, Ottawa Rough Riders
HB – Norm Perry, Sarnia Imperials
HB – Jack Sinclair, University of Toronto
DB – Abe Eliowitz, Ottawa Rough Riders
E  – Andy Henderson, University of Toronto
E  – Syd Reynolds, Toronto Balmy Beach Beachers
C  – John Metras, St. Michael's College
G – Joe Veroni, University of Western Ontario
G – John Baker, Sarnia Imperials
T – Abe Zvonkin, Queen's University
T – Dave Sprague, Ottawa Rough Riders

1934 Ontario Rugby Football Union All-StarsNOTE: During this time most players played both ways, so the All-Star selections do not distinguish between some offensive and defensive positions.''
QB – Alex Hayes, Sarnia Imperials
FW – Ormond Beach, Sarnia Imperials
HB – Norm Perry, Sarnia Imperials
HB – Hugh Marks, St. Michael's College
DB – Hugh Sterling, Sarnia Imperials
E  – Syd Reynolds, Toronto Balmy Beach Beachers
E  – John Manore, Sarnia Imperials
C  – John Metras, St. Michael's College
G – Pat Bulter, Sarnia Imperials
G – Clifford Parsons, Sarnia Imperials
T – Gil Putnam, Sarnia Imperials
T – Harry Smith, Sarnia Imperials

1934 Canadian Football Awards
 Jeff Russel Memorial Trophy (IRFU MVP) – Ab Box (QB), Toronto Argonauts
 Imperial Oil Trophy (ORFU MVP) - Norm Perry - Sarnia Imperials

References

 
Canadian Football League seasons